Presentational may refer to:
 something related to presentation
 Presentational acting, a style of acting that acknowledges the audience
 Presentational (grammar), a grammatical construction that introduces, and draws the attention towards, a new referent

See also 
 Presentative (disambiguation)